Dulce of Aragon also called Dulce of Barcelona, was Queen of Portugal as the wife of King Sancho I of Portugal.

Life
As the eldest daughter of Queen Petronila of Aragon and her husband, Count Ramon Berenguer IV of Barcelona, she was the sister of the future King Alfonso II of Aragon.

Her bethrothal to infante Sancho, son of Afonso Henriques, the first king of Portugal, was celebrated when she was eleven years old and the marriage in 1174. Not much is known about her life prior to her arrival in Portugal or of the wedding tokens she received upon her marriage.

"A beautiful and excellent lady, quiet and modest, her personality coinciding with her name," Dulce was used as a commodity to seal an alliance which aimed to "strengthen Portugal and to contain the expansionism of Castile and León" and she played the role that was expected of her as a wife and as the mother of numerous children. At the same time, the marriage compensated for the broken engagement of her husband's sister, Infanta Mafalda with her brother, the future King Alfonso II of Aragon. With the death of King Afonso Henriques in 1185, her husband ascended the throne and she became Queen consort of Portugal. In his first will, executed in 1188, her husband gave her the income from Alenquer, of the lands along the banks of the Vouga River, of Santa Maria da Feira and of Oporto.

Dulce did not live long after the birth of her last two daughters, Branca and Berengaria, probably twins, and died in 1198 probably succumbing to the plague and weakened by the successive childbirths. She was buried in the Monastery of Santa Cruz in Coimbra.

Issue 
Eleven children were born from her marriage to King Sancho, eight of whom reached adulthood:
 Theresa (1175/1176 – 18 June 1250), she became the wife of King Alfonso IX of León and was beatified in 1705;
 Sancha (1180 – 13 March 1229), founded the Monastery of Celas near Coimbra where she lived until her death. Her sister Theresa arranged for her burial at the Monastery of Lorvão. She was beatified by Pope Clement XI in 1705, the same year as Theresa;
 Constanza (May 1182 – 3 August 1202). She must have died before 1186 since her name is not registered in any of the documents of the chancellery of Sancho I which begins in that year";
 Afonso (23 April 1186 – 25 March 1223), succeeded his father as the third king of Portugal;
 Raymond (1187/88 – 9 March bef. 1188/89), who died in infancy;
 Peter (23 February 1187 – 2 June 1258), spouse of Aurembiaix, countess of Urgell;
 Ferdinand (24 March 1188 – 27 July 1233), count through his marriage to Joan, Countess of Flanders;
 Henry (aft. March 1189 – 8 Dec aft. 1189), who died during infancy;
 Mafalda (1195/1196 – 1 May 1256), the wife of Henry I of Castile, was beatified in 1793;
 Branca (1198 – 17 November 1240), probably the twin sister of Berengaria, was raised in the court with her father and his mistress "a Ribeirinha" and, when she was eight or ten years old, was sent to live with her sisters at the Monastery of Lorvão. She was a nun at a convent in Guadalajara and was buried at the same monastery as her mother;
 Berengaria (1198 – 27 March 1221), probably the twin sister of Branca, married Valdemar II of Denmark in 1214.

Notes

References

Bibliography 

 
 
 

1160 births
1198 deaths
Portuguese queens consort
Aragonese infantas
12th-century Portuguese people
12th-century Portuguese women